Mundo literário: semanário de crítica e informação literária, científica e artística (Portuguese for "World Literature")  was a Portuguese review published in Lisbon from 1946 to 1948.

The seminary's weekly director-general was Jaime Cortesão Casimiro and its literary head was Adolfo Casais Monteiro, they formed a directive body to the journal, Emil Andersen and Luís de Sousa Rebelo. Its creation occurs of a context of lack of freedom of the press, being in the sights of censorship. 53 issues were made. A previous leaflet announced the coming of the weekly, which brought up-to-date information in culture, it covered literature, theatre, cinema, scientific views, lecture tribunal, plastic arts, books and more.

Writers
Writers included: 
 
 António José Saraiva
 João Gaspar Simões
 Augusto Abelaira
 Pedro Homem de Mello
 Eugénio de Andrade
 Matilde Rosa Araújo
 Jacinto do Prado Coelho
 Vitorino Magalhães Godinho
 Alexandre O'Neill
 Alves Redol
 José Régio
 Jorge de Sena
 Joel Serrão
 Fernando Namora
 Edmundo Curvelo
 Mário Sacramento
 António Branquinho da Fonseca
 Aguinaldo Brito Fonseca
 Rui Grácio
 Diogo de Macedo
 Luís Francisco Rebello
 Murilo Mendes
 Carlos Drummond de Andrade
 Castro Soromenho
 António Sérgio
 Alexandre Pinheiro Torres
 Manuela Porto
 Cândido Costa Pinto
 António Pedro
 Álvaro Salema
 Júlio Pomar
 Abel Manta
 José Ernesto de Sousa
 Mário Novais
 Pedro da Silveira
 Fernando de Azevedo
 Rómulo de Carvalho
 João José Cochofel
 Nataniel Costa
 Mário Dionísio 
 Sebastião da Gama

References

External links
Mundo literário : semanário de crítica e informação literária, científica e artística, digittal copy at  Digital 

1946 establishments in Portugal
1948 disestablishments in Portugal
Cultural magazines
Defunct literary magazines
Defunct magazines published in Portugal
Magazines established in 1946
Magazines disestablished in 1948
Magazines published in Lisbon
Portuguese-language magazines
Literary magazines published in Portugal
Weekly magazines published in Portugal